The common collared lizard (Crotaphytus collaris), also commonly called eastern collared lizard, Oklahoma collared lizard, yellow-headed collared lizard, and collared lizard, is a North American species of lizard in the family Crotaphytidae. The common name "collared lizard" comes from the lizard's distinct coloration, which includes bands of black around the neck and shoulders that look like a collar. Males can be very colorful, with blue green bodies, yellow stripes on the tail and back, and yellow orange throats. There are five recognized subspecies.

Etymology 
The subspecific name, baileyi, is in honor of American mammalogist Vernon Orlando Bailey.

Subspecies
Five subspecies are recognized as being valid, including the nominotypical subspecies.
Crotaphytus collaris auriceps 
Crotaphytus collaris baileyi 
Crotaphytus collaris collaris 
Crotaphytus collaris fuscus 
Crotaphytus collaris melanomaculatus 

Nota bene: A trinomial authority in parentheses indicates that the subspecies was originally described in a genus other than Crotaphytus.

Description
Males have a blue-green body with a light brown head. Females have a light brown head and body.
C. collaris exhibit a wide range of physical characteristics, particularly in coloration and spotting patterns, and this phenotypic variability may be attributed to a combination of differences in population, social organizations, or habitat. They are a sexually dichromatic lizard species with the adult males being more vivid and colorful than the females. Male dorsal and head color tend to range from green to tan and yellow to orange respectively, while females, overall, possess more muted body pigmentations, varying from brown to gray. However, when reproductively active during breeding seasons, females undergo a rapid color change, in which faint orange spots on their heads increase in brightness; this orange spotting reaches a maximum during egg maturation but gradually fades again after expulsion from the female’s oviduct as she lays her eggs. Both males and females have two distinct black bands around their neck, providing additional context to their name, the common collared lizards.

Similar to adult females, juveniles also exhibit dull body colorations compared to adult males, but a key distinction is that the young have pronounced, dark brown markings that eventually fade as they grow and mature. Consequently, juvenile collared lizards lose this sharp cross-band pattern, and their features drastically change to resemble those of either adult males or females.

Moderate in size, C. collaris have disproportionately large heads and long hind limbs. It can reach a length of 14 inches, including the tail, with males being larger than females. Hence, they are sexually dimorphic, and adult males exhibit larger and more muscular heads than females, which tend to vary in size. Used as a weapon during male combat, the head dimensions play a key role in determining dominance, territoriality, fitness, as well as mating success. In general, bigger heads are associated with greater jaw strength and thus, bite force.

Bipedal locomotion 
C. collaris are known for their bipedal locomotion–the ability to run on their two hind legs–and can sprint at incredible speeds of up to 24 kilometers per hour; this behavior is usually observed when trying to escape predators.

Like many other lizards, including the frilled lizard and basilisk, the collared lizard can run on its hind legs, and is a relatively fast sprinter.

Geographic range and habitat
C. collaris is chiefly found in dry, open regions of Mexico and the south-central United States including Arizona, Arkansas, Colorado, Kansas, Missouri, New Mexico, Oklahoma, and Texas. The full extent of its habitat in the United States ranges from the Ozark Mountains to Western Arizona.    

C. collaris is distributed across the Southwestern United States and extend to Northern Mexico as well. Individuals occupy a range of different habitats from rocky desert landscapes to grasslands, but they often prefer to inhabit mountainous regions with high environmental temperatures for optimal thermoregulation. In addition, the hilly topography allows these keen and highly alert lizards to stay hidden between rocks, despite their flamboyant features, and look out for potential predators or territory intruders from the top of elevated platforms.

Diet 
As obligate carnivores, they consume insects and small vertebrates as their main diet. While they may occasionally ingest plant materials, it is not preferred. They feed on a variety of large insects, including crickets, grasshoppers, spiders, moths, beetles, and cicadas, along with other small lizards and even snakes. As plants do not provide enough nutrients for constant body weight maintenance, C. collaris cannot survive solely on an herbivorous diet. Their stomachs are too small to accommodate the amount of flowers, shrubs, herbs, etc. that would be needed to maintain a constant body weight. Thus, they are considered obligate carnivores, requiring nutrients from arthropods or other small reptiles. 

Diet can also vary depending on age, sex, as well as seasonal changes. In the case of younger lizards, they consume the same kinds of foods, specifically insect species, that adults do, but since younger lizards and adults differ in body size and weight, the amount of food intake tends to vary. On the other hand, male and female adults are similar in terms of their sizes and the amounts of food ingested but exhibit drastic differences in the kinds of foods that they eat. From an evolutionary standpoint, these sexual differences in diet may act to reduce intra-species competition for resources, whereby females and males do not need to fight for the same type of food. Moreover, changes in season can drastically affect their diets as well.

Cultural impact
The collared lizard is the state reptile of Oklahoma, where it is known as the mountain boomer. The origin of the name "mountain boomer" is  not clear, but it may be traceable to settlers traveling west during the Gold Rush. One theory is that settlers mistook the sound of wind in canyons for the call of an animal in an area where the collared lizard was abundant. In reality, collared lizards are silent.

Behavior

Collared lizards are diurnal; they are active during the day, and spend most of their time basking on top of elevated rocks or boulders. As a highly territorial species, they remain hyper-vigilant, scanning for predators or intruders, ready to sprint or fight when necessary. Generally, males are more active than females, as the former engage in more chase, fight, display, and courtship behaviors while the latter exhibit basking and foraging behaviors. The collared lizard in the wild has been the subject of a number of studies of sexual selection; in captivity if two males are placed in the same cage they will fight to the death. Females, on the other hand, do not demonstrate aggressive behaviors as frequently as males, experiencing less intra-species competition with other females.

Social Behavior 
In an effort to monopolize as many female mates as they can, male C. collaris viciously defend their exclusive territories through aggression, patrolling activities, and displays. These territories provide ample resources and shelter the harem of females claimed and protected by the male territory owners. However, when agonistic interactions between male rivals escalate to violent fights, both lizards must expend substantial amounts of energy and risk getting seriously injured. Thus, though males do actively exclude other males from territories, they do so without resorting to physical and unfavorable conflict. Instead, they partake in social displays, either at a distance or proximally from their competitors to advertise their superiority. Surprisingly, both types of social encounters, in which males perform push ups and compressions and elevations of the trunk with the dewlap extended, rarely lead to arduous and violent fights; rather, distant displays barely evoke a response while proximal confrontations may lead to chasing at most.  

Furthermore, C. collaris territory owners exhibit differential behaviors in response to neighbors and strangers, in which residents reduce the cost of territorial defense by demonstrating less aggression for spatial neighbors. Thus, when nearby residents approach an owner’s shared territorial boundaries, the owner will recognize this individual and only engage in aggressive behaviors, usually in the form of a costly fight, if a threat to its territory is perceived. However, in the case of a stranger, the owner will exhibit intense hostility towards the intruder without hesitation. In relation, male territorial behaviors also vary within the reproductive season, decreasing in June due to the higher prevalence of reproductively active females and instead, engaging in more courtship behaviors. This cost-benefit strategy demonstrates the complex social behaviors and decision making processes exhibited by the male collared lizards.

Reproduction 
The reproductive season starts in mid-March to early April and concludes in mid-July. Females and smaller individuals emerge first from hibernation with males following around two weeks later. Though lizards are considered mature and may breed following their first hibernation, those that are two years and older exhibit greater reproductive success due to their larger size. In late May, courtship occurs between adult males and females. Subsequently, mature females, typically two years and older, produce their first clutches and lay them in a burrow or under a rock about two weeks after copulation. They may then go on to produce second and sometimes even third clutches throughout June until mid-July. The eggs are incubated in a temperature dependent manner, and the incubation period may vary from 50 to 100 days. On average, clutch size can range from 4 to 6 eggs, but larger, older females can produce more. By August, adults begin to hibernate again, and juveniles do the same after hatching. The earliest of the clutches can hatch in mid-July and later ones follow until mid-October. Upon hatching, juveniles are fully developed and behave independently of their parents, as the C. collaris do not exhibit any parental care in offspring.

Mating Behavior and Rituals
C. collaris are polygamous, which leads to intense territorial behaviors that include male to male competition for females partners. This triggers aggressive behaviors in males and induces fierce competition for mating. With regards to female selection of male mates, females not only prefer males who are bright and conspicuous in body coloration but also consider the resources such as food and territory that males may be able to provide in order to ensure reproductive success. Moreover, as males often must compete with other males for potential mates, their body and head size play a significant role in determining mating success. The variability in head size gives rise to differential jaw strength and bite force in males, which ultimately results in intra-species selection against smaller headed males. For example, if an instance of male-to-male conflict escalates into a violent fight between two males, the larger male with a substantial larger body mass and head size will overpower its weaker and smaller counterpart. Consequently, successful males may, more often than not, possess vibrant body coloration and patterns and may be bigger in size, specifically having larger head proportions.

During courtship rituals, a male or a female lizard approaches the opposite sex within 1 body length and subsequently engages in various behavioral patterns, which include either individual superimposing its limbs, torso, or tail over its partner, mounting the dorsum of the other lizard, males nudging females with their snouts or grasping them with their jaws, and mutual displays. These mutual displays involve a complex set of movements and behaviors, unique to each sex. Males flex their forearms up and down and extend their dewlaps while females also extend their dewlaps and raise the base of their tails to signal receptivity. Ultimately, at the end of this courting process, both sexes walk in circles, making sure to remain within 1 body length of one another throughout.

Gallery

References

External links

Further reading
Axtell RW, Webb RG (1995). "Two new Crotaphytus from southern Coahuila and the adjacent states of east-central Mexico". Bulletin of the Chicago Academy of Sciences 16 (2): 1–15. (Crotaphytus collaris melanomaculatus, new subspecies).

Fitch HS, Tanner WW (1951). "Remarks Concerning the Systematics of the Collared Lizard, (Crotaphytus collaris), with a Description of a New Subspecies". Transactions of the Kansas Academy of Science 54 (4): 548–559. (Crotaphytus collaris auriceps, new subspecies).
Ingram W, Tanner WW (1971). "A taxonomic study of Crotaphytus collaris between the Rio Grande and Colorado Rivers". Brigham Young University Science Bulletin 13 (2): 1–29. (Crotaphytus collaris fuscus, new subspecies).
Powell R, Conant R, Collins JT (2016). Peterson Field Guide to Reptiles and Amphibians of Eastern and Central North America, Fourth Edition. Boston and New York: Houghton Mifflin Harcourt. 494 pp., 47 plates, 207 figures. . (Crotaphytus collaris, pp. 276–277, Figure 132 + Plate 24).
Say T (1823). In: James E (1823). Account of an Expedition from Pittsburgh to the Rocky Mountains, Performed in the Years 1819 and '20, by order of the Hon. J.C. Calhoun, Sec'y of War: Under the Command of Major Stephen H. Long. From the Notes of Major Long, Mr. T. Say, and other Gentlemen of the Exploring Party. Vol. II. Philadelphia: H.C. Carey and I. Lea. 442 pp. (Agama collaris, new species, p. 252).
Smith HM, Brodie ED Jr (1982). Reptiles of North America: A Guide to Field Identification. New York: Golden Press. 240 pp.  (paperback),  (hardcover). (Crotaphytus collaris, pp. 106–107).
Stejneger L (1890). "Annotated List of Reptiles and Batrachians Collected by Dr. C. Hart Merriam and Vernon Bailey on the San Francisco Mountain Plateau and Desert of the Little Colorado, Arizona, with Descriptions of New Species". North American Fauna (3): 103–118. (Crotaphytus baileyi, new species, pp. 103–105 + Plate XII, figure 1).).

Crotaphytus
Reptiles of the United States
Reptiles of Mexico
Reptiles described in 1823
Taxa named by Thomas Say
